Jennie Knight may refer to:
 Jennie B. Knight, leader in the Church of Jesus Christ of Latter-day Saints 
 Jennie Lea Knight, American sculptor